Xane D'Almeida (born 21 January 1983) is a Senegalese professional basketball player. While playing for Pau-Orthez, he won the 2004 league title and the 2007 French Basketball Cup. Despite being born in Paris, D'Almeida officially represents Senegal in international competition, and has participated in the 2011 FIBA Africa Championship and 2014 FIBA Basketball World Cup. D'Almeida plays both the point guard and shooting guard positions on the court.

References

1983 births
Living people
French sportspeople of Senegalese descent
Citizens of Senegal through descent
Point guards
Senegalese men's basketball players
Shooting guards
Basketball players from Paris
2014 FIBA Basketball World Cup players
2019 FIBA Basketball World Cup players